The Defence of Iwardo ( - Iwardo or In wardo, Ayin Warda, Ain Wardo) was a military engagement between Ottoman authorities and Assyrian defenders led by Gallo Shabo in 1915, during the Assyrian genocide. The pockets of resistance during the Assyrian genocide was named "Midyat Rebellion" after Midyat, the largest Assyrian town in Tur Abdin by the Ottoman authorities.

Background 
Prior to the start of World War I, the village of Gülgöze had about 200 families, all of whom were ethnic Assyrians who belonged to the Syriac Orthodox Church. During the Assyrian genocide, thousands of refugees from throughout Tur Abdin arrived there for safety. Refugees arrived from villages including Habasnos, Midyat, Bote, Keferze, Kafro Eloyto, Mzizah and Urnas. Even refugees from outside Tur Abdin arrived, coming from villages such as Deqlath, Bscheriye, Gozarto, Hesno d Kifo and Mifarqin. Between 6000 and 7000 Assyrians were gathered in the village.

Once within the walls of Ayn-Wardo, the refugees were given water and food, and then assigned to defensive duties. The villagers were well prepared because they had realized when the First World War started that it would sooner or later be a threat to them. They had reinforced the walls around the village and armed themselves for war.

Defense and battle 
Aware that the Turks and Kurds were coming to Gülgöze, the villagers and refugees created a militia to defend themselves, which was led by Gallo Shabo. Their resistance lasted 52-60 days and ended in success.

At the same time, the Kurdish leadership of Midyat was given orders to attack Gülgöze and Arnas. However, Aziz Agha, the leader of the Midyat area, told the government that they didn't have enough soldiers to attack both areas, and therefore they would attack Gulgoze only, and then go to Arnas later on. Therefore, the Kurds of Tur Abdin and Ramman, under the generalship of Ahmed Agha and Salem Agha, gathered a force of 13,000 men in Mardin. The government authorized the distribution of arms. They headed towards Gülgöze, arriving late at night, to begin the siege.

After hours of exchanging fire, the Assyrians defeated the Kurds and drove them out, but there were many casualties on both sides. After 10 days, the Kurds attacked again only to be beaten yet once more, as they lost well over 300 men. Before the beginning of a third attempt, Kurdish leaders called for aid from the mayors of Diyarbakır (Raschid) and Mardin (Badri). However, a third attempt also failed and after 30 days of battle, Aziz Agha suggested a peace treaty between the two sides. An Assyrian delegation met with Aziz to discuss a peace treaty, but refused to lay down their weapons, so the battle continued. The siege continued for another 30 days, leading to many deaths on both sides. In the end, the Kurdish soldiers retreated and left the Assyrians of Tur Abdin alone. This is why the Tur Abdin region is one of the only major Christian areas left in Turkey outside of Istanbul. The total death toll of the 60-day siege is unknown, but was at least 1,000.

References

Assyrian genocide
History of the Assyrians
Tur Abdin
Military operations of World War I involving the Ottoman Empire